Stephen Dearn (March 1901 – 1947) was an English professional footballer who made over 100 appearances as an inside forward and left half in the Football League for Brentford and Portsmouth.

Career statistics

References

1901 births
People from Halesowen
English footballers
English Football League players
Association football inside forwards
Brentford F.C. players
Association football wing halves
Aston Villa F.C. players
Portsmouth F.C. players
1947 deaths
Halesowen Town F.C. players